Ling Yingzhen (20 July 1913 – 8 September 1981) was a Chinese politician. She was among the first group of women elected to the Legislative Yuan in 1948.

Biography
Originally from Shanghai County, Ling graduated from the University of Shanghai and worked as an advisor at the Ministry of Social Affairs.

A member of the Central Women's Trade Union, Ling was elected to the Legislative Yuan as a representative of women's trade unions in the 1948 elections. She relocated to Taiwan during the Chinese Civil War, where she remained a member of the Legislative Yuan until her death in 1981.

References

1913 births
University of Shanghai alumni
Chinese civil servants
20th-century Chinese women politicians
Members of the 1st Legislative Yuan
Members of the 1st Legislative Yuan in Taiwan
1981 deaths